Brian Mitchell (born October 15, 1969) is a former college football and professional arena football player.

Career
Mitchell played college football for the Marshall Thundering Herd in 1987 and the Northern Iowa Panthers (UNI) from 1989 to 1991. He holds many UNI football records and NCAA records as well, including the most accurate single-season kicker in NCAA college football history (26 for 27 in field goals). His longest field goal was 57 yards in 1990. He was a member of the Marshall squad that competed in the 1987 NCAA Division I-AA Football Championship Game. Mitchell was named number six on the Football Championship Subdivision (FCS; formerly Division I-AA) Top 30 Kickers all-time list between 1978 and 2008.

Mitchell played two years of professional football in the Arena Football League, in 1994 for the Cleveland Thunderbolts and in 1995 for the St. Louis Stampede. Mitchell kicked 6 drop kick field goals and 18 drop kick extra points in 1994. Mitchell holds every drop kick record in the Arena Football League. As of 2018, Mitchell is the only player to make a 4-point field goal (drop kick) in Arena Football League history.

References

External links
Arena League statistics

1969 births
Living people
American football placekickers
Marshall Thundering Herd football players
Northern Iowa Panthers football players
Cleveland Thunderbolts players
St. Louis Stampede players